Hayk Harut’yuni Chobanyan (born March 5, 1973) is an Armenian historian, public official. He has been the Minister of High-Tech Industry (02.04.2021-04.08.2021). He was also Governor of Tavush Marz rom 2019 to 2021. Chairman of the board, Center of Scientific innovation and educational foundation. President, Aerodynamics CJSC.

Biography
Chobanyan was born in 1973 in the village Tavush of Tavush Region. Graduated from the local secondary school. From 1990 to 1995 Chobanyan studied at the History Department of Yerevan State University, where he was the first president of YSU Student Council. From 1995 to 1999 he studied at the Public Administration Academy of the Republic of Armenia. From 1995 to 1997 he served in the Armenian Army.

From 1997 to 1998 Chobanyan worked in the editorial staff of the "Civil Servant Newsletter" magazine, from 1998 to 2001 worked in the government, then in the Ministry of Justice. From 2001 to 2003 he worked as Publishing Director, from 2003 to 2012 as the Director of Nork Information and Analytical Center at the Ministry of Labor and Social Affairs of the Republic of Armenia. From 2006 to 2013 Chobanyan was Board Member of the Union of Information Technology Enterprises. In 2012 he founded Arpi Solar Company, and in the same year headed Tavush Spiritual Revival Foundation. From 2014 to 2017 he worked as a Deputy Director of the Union of Information Technology Enterprises and Director of UITE EXPO. In 2016, he founded the Sustainable Energy Development Fund, and in 2018, Freenergy Company. Since 2016 he has been the Chairman of the Board of Trustees of the “Real School” Foundation, and since 2017 the Chairman of the Armenian Festival Association.

On February 6, 2019, Chobanyan was appointed Governor of Tavush Marz by the decision of the Government of the Republic of Armenia.

On April 2, 2021, by the decree of the President of the Republic of Armenia, Chobanyan was appointed Minister of High-Tech Industry of the Republic of Armenia.

Awards 
 YSU Silver Commemorative Medal (2009)
 Medal of Marshal Baghramyan (2019)
 Gold Medal of the Ministry of Labor and Social Affairs

Family
He is married to artist Armine Tumanyan. They have two children: a daughter and a son.

References

External links
 Tavush’s Hayk Chobanyan enjoys highest approval rating among governors of Armenia
 Hayk Chobanyan: We should make Tavush the best place for rest
 Security number one priority in Tavush: Hayk Chobanyan
 Governor Hayk Chobanyan: There will be no unused land in Tavush Province within 2 years

1973 births
Living people
21st-century Armenian historians
Armenian politicians